Edward R. Bowman (1826 – 1898) was a sailor in the U.S. Navy during the American Civil War. He received the Medal of Honor for his actions during the Second Battle of Fort Fisher on January 15, 1865.

Military service
Bowman volunteered for service in the U.S. Navy and was assigned  to the Union sloop-of-war . His enlistment is credited to the state of Maine.

On January 15, 1865, the North Carolina Confederate stronghold of Fort Fisher was taken by a combined Union storming party of sailors, marines, and soldiers under the command of Admiral David Dixon Porter and General Alfred Terry. Bowman was aboard the Ticonderoga which directed its fire at Fort Fisher.

Medal of Honor citation
The President of the United States of America, in the name of Congress, takes pleasure in presenting the Medal of Honor to Quartermaster Edward R. Bowman, United States Navy, for extraordinary heroism in action while serving on board the U.S.S. TICONDEROGA during attacks on Fort Fisher, North Carolina, 13 to 15 January 1865. Despite severe wounds sustained during the action Quartermaster Bowman displayed outstanding courage in the performance of duty as his ship maintained its well-placed fire upon the batteries on shore, and thereafter, as she materially lessened the power of guns on the mound which had been turned upon our assaulting columns. During this battle the flag was planted on one of the strongest fortifications possessed by the rebels.

General Orders: War Department, General Orders No. 59 (June 22, 1865)

Action Date: January 15, 1865

Service: Navy

Rank: Quartermaster

Division: U.S.S. Ticonderoga

See also

List of American Civil War Medal of Honor recipients: A–F
List of Medal of Honor recipients for the Second Battle of Fort Fisher

References

1826 births
1898 deaths
United States Navy Medal of Honor recipients
Union Navy sailors
People of Maine in the American Civil War
People from Eastport, Maine
American Civil War recipients of the Medal of Honor